The Gold Retirement Medallion is awarded by the Central Intelligence Agency for a career of 35 years or more with the Agency.

See also 
Awards and decorations of the United States government

References

Retirement medallions of the Central Intelligence Agency